John Hay of Cromlix (1691–1740) was the Jacobite Duke of Inverness and a courtier and army officer to the King James VIII & III (known as the "Old Pretender").  He was from the Clan Hay.

Life 
His parents were Thomas Hay, seventh earl of Kinnoull (c.1660–1719) and Elizabeth (1669–1696).  He was their third son, with their first son, George (d. 1758), succeeding their father. The family was sympathetic to the Stuart kings but still felt that being Protestant and serving Queen Anne and supporting the Harley administration did not mar this sympathy and loyalty.  

John's maternal grandfather William Drummond, first viscount of Strathallan, bequeathed Thomas an estate at Cromlix, Perthshire.  Thomas purchased a commission in command of a foot guards company in 1714 and a year later married Marjorie Murray (d. in or after 1765), daughter of David Murray, fifth Viscount Stormont, and sister of the Earl of Mansfield and the Jacobite James Murray, "Earl of Dunbar".  On 5 October 1718 John Hay was created by James III & VIII (the "Old Pretender") Earl of Inverness, Viscount of Innerpaphrie and Lord Cromlix and Erne in the Jacobite Scottish peerage. The Old Pretender appointed him his Secretary of State in 1725, and his wife and brother-in-law governess and tutor to the royal children at the same time.  Thus John Hay and John Murray became known as the "King's favourites".  

However, in 1725, one of James Stuart's wife Clementina's cited reasons for retiring to a convent was ill-treatment by Lord and Lady Inverness, and another was Murray's being imposed on her as her children's governor despite being a Protestant.  These complaints may, however, have been influenced somewhat by the children's former governess Mrs Sheldon, sister-in-law of John Erskine, 6th Earl of Mar.  Mar's failed rebellion in 1715 and further intrigues had eventually led to his being replaced by John Hay as James Stuart's intermediary between the exiled Jacobites and those still in Britain, and Mar had sworn revenge on Hay for this loss of royal favour.  However, other Jacobites' correspondence suggests that some ill-treatment of Clementina by the Hays did occur, though the suggestion that Lady Inverness and James Stuart were having an affair, with Lord Inverness turning a blind eye, is less likely to be a fact than merely a rumour begun by Mar and the English government. Whatever the reasons for Clementina's retirement, however, it began to alienate James Stuart's supporters in Britain as well as the main contributors to his pension, Pope Benedict XIII and the King of Spain, and so he reluctantly accepted Hay's resignation as Secretary of State in 1727, upon which Clementina left the convent but threatened to return at any time should her husband or his court step out of line. James nevertheless elevated Hay in April 1727 to the titular Dukedom of Inverness and further created him Baron Hay in the Jacobite Peerage of England.

Hay moved out of active political involvement into retirement in the Jacobite colony in Avignon, France by 1738, to which James Murray also retired later.  In that year, with his brother William garnering European support for James and a Jacobite invasion of Britain, and Anglo-French relations on the slide, Thomas wrote to Dr. Robin Wright, James Francis Edward Stuart's physician, stating:

External links 
 Dictionary of National Biography
 A letter from John Hay

1691 births
1740 deaths
Scottish Jacobites
Protestant Jacobites
Younger sons of earls
People from Stirling (council area)
18th-century Scottish people
People of the Jacobite rising of 1715
John
Inverness, John Hay, 1st Duke of